Nicolette Teo Wei Min (Teo Wei-min, ; born 19 April 1986) is a Singaporean swimmer who specializes in breaststroke.

High school
Nicolette was a former student at Methodist Girls' School in Singapore. Nicolette represented Mission Viejo High School in the California Interscholastic Federation's swimming tournament. She finished second in the 100 yard Breast clocking in a time of 1:02.17 and finished 4th in the 200 yard IM event with the time of 2:04:79. She also topped the long course times for the 100 m and 200 m breaststroke events.

College
Teo swam for the University of California, Los Angeles.  Nicolette earned All-American honors at the NCAA Championships as a member of the 400 m Medley Relay team that placed 13th. She also placed 22nd and 29th in the 100 m and 200 m breaststroke events respectively in the same tournament. In 2005, Nicolette represented Singapore in the World Championships in the 50 m, 100 m and 200 m breaststroke events.

Competitions
Nicolette represented Singapore in the 2000 Summer Olympics and the 2004 Summer Olympics. She participated in the 2005 Southeast Asian Games, 2007 Southeast Asian Games as well as the 2006 Asian Games. Having met the B cuts for the 2008 Summer Olympics in the 100 and 200 Breaststroke, Nicolette will be making her 3rd appearance at an Olympics.

SEA Games
Gold (9): 
 200 Breaststroke (1999) 2:36.27 
 100 Breaststroke (2001) 1:12.64
 4x100 Freestyle Relay (2003) 3:54.47
 4x100 Medley Relay (2003) 4:20.49
 200 Breaststroke (2005) 2:34.56
 4x100 Medley Relay (2005) 4:14.49
 100 Breaststroke (2007) 1:10.15
 200 Breaststroke (2007) 2:31.96
 4x100 Medley Relay (2007) 4:13.18

Silver (7): 
 200 Breaststroke (2001) 2:35.01
 4x100 Freestyle Relay (2001) 3:54.75
 4x100 Medley Relay (2001) 4:23.41
 100 Breaststroke (2003) 1:13.67
 200 Breaststroke (2003) 2:36.36
 100 Breaststroke (2005) 1:11.80
 200 IM (2005) 2:22.86

Bronze (1): 
 200 IM (2003) 2:22.85

National records
100 Breaststroke: 1:10.15 (2007)

200 Breaststroke: 2:31.96 (2007)

References

External links
 
 
 
 
 

1986 births
Living people
Singaporean female breaststroke swimmers
Singaporean female medley swimmers
Asian Games competitors for Singapore
Competitors at the 2005 Southeast Asian Games
Competitors at the 2007 Southeast Asian Games
Olympic swimmers of Singapore
Singaporean sportspeople of Chinese descent
Southeast Asian Games medalists in swimming
Southeast Asian Games gold medalists for Singapore
Southeast Asian Games silver medalists for Singapore
Southeast Asian Games bronze medalists for Singapore
Swimmers at the 2002 Asian Games
Swimmers at the 2004 Summer Olympics
Swimmers at the 2006 Asian Games
Swimmers at the 2008 Summer Olympics
UCLA Bruins women's swimmers
21st-century Singaporean women